The Silk Route is a number of trade routes across the Afro-Eurasian landmass.

Silk Route may also refer to:

 Silk Route (band), an Indian music band

See also
 Silk Road (disambiguation)